Thomas Pablo Croquet (born 21 November 1976), known as Thomas Mars, is a French musician and the lead singer of the French indie pop band Phoenix.

Early life 
Thomas Pablo Croquet was born on 21 November 1976 in Versailles, France. Croquet was originally inspired to learn English by his uncle, Horst.

When Croquet was ten, he formed the band Phoenix with schoolfriends Chris Mazzalai and Deck d'Arcy. Mazzalai's older brother, Laurent Brancowitz, also joined the band after the break-up of Darlin'. Croquet says that he "destroyed every single other option that would lead me to any potential career other than music", attending college for only four days, studying economics.

Career 

Croquet is the frontman for the band Phoenix, that was founded in the early 1990s. The band eventually became a full-time profession for Mars following his dropping out of college. The band pressed 500 copies of a single on their own label before being signed to Paris-based label, Source Records.

Croquet wrote and produced Phoenix's first charting single in France, "Too Young", which peaked at number 97. Eventually Phoenix's first studio album, United was released in 2000, shipping 150,000 units worldwide.

The band has released six albums and won a Grammy Award in 2010.

Personal life
In 2011, Croquet married filmmaker Sofia Coppola at Palazzo Margherita in Bernalda. The couple met whilst producing the soundtrack to one of Coppola's films. They have two daughters together, Romy and Cosima.

The German literary critic Hellmuth Karasek was his uncle.

As of 2018, Croquet lived in New York with his wife and children. He traveled to Paris monthly and has a residence there since the rest of his band Phoenix lives in France.

References

1976 births
Living people
20th-century French musicians
21st-century French musicians
People from Versailles
Grammy Award winners
21st-century French singers
20th-century French male musicians
21st-century French male singers